The  2020 United States Open Championship was the 120th U.S. Open, held September 17–20 over the West Course at Winged Foot Golf Club in Mamaroneck, New York, a suburb northeast of New York City. Originally scheduled for June 18–21, the championship was postponed three months due to the COVID-19 pandemic and was played without spectators. It was the first U.S. Open held in September in 107 years.

Bryson DeChambeau won his first major title with a six-under-par 274. His final round 67 (−3) was three strokes better than the rest of the field and turned a two-stroke deficit into a six-stroke victory margin over runner-up Matthew Wolff, the 54-hole leader who shot 75. In his five previous U.S. Opens, DeChambeau's best result was a tie for fifteenth. The 21-year-old Wolff was attempting to become the youngest U.S. Open champion since Bobby Jones in 1923 and the first to win in his U.S. Open debut since amateur Francis Ouimet in 1913.

Course

It was the sixth time the U.S. Open had been held on West Course at Winged Foot, regarded as one of the toughest courses in major championship golf. Previously in 2006, Geoff Ogilvy won with a five-over-par 285; and Hale Irwin won with 287 (+7) in 1974, later dubbed the "Massacre at Winged Foot."

The A. W. Tillinghast designed course underwent renovations starting in 2017 under the guidance of architect Gil Hanse, with the overall length being increased and the designated par of the 5th and 9th holes being switched from the last time it hosted the U.S. Open; the 5th becoming a par 4 and the 9th a par 5.

Lengths of the course for previous majors:

2020 yardages by round

 Scoring average: 74.018
 by round: 72.561, 75.275, 73.629, 74.900
 Most difficult holes in relation to par: 3, 18, 2, 5, and 10

Source:

Field

Normally, about half the field qualifies for the U.S. Open via local and sectional qualifying. However, due to the COVID–19 pandemic, in 2020, the entire field consisted of players who were exempt from qualifying. The revised exemption criteria were announced on June 25. Existing exemptions were retained and the field was reduced from 156 to 144. Among several changes to exemption criteria, additional places were awarded based on performances in tournaments on the PGA and European tours, and many other spots were filled from various ranking and money lists with cut-off dates nearer the rescheduled tournament dates.

Ten past U.S. Open champions were in the field. They were Lucas Glover, world number one Dustin Johnson, Martin Kaymer, Graeme McDowell, Rory McIlroy, Justin Rose, Webb Simpson, Jordan Spieth, defending champion Gary Woodland, and three-time winner Tiger Woods. 2017 and 2018 champion Brooks Koepka did not play due to injury.

Rule changes
Due to a rule change, the U.S. Amateur champion no longer forfeits his U.S. Open exemption if he turns professional.

Weather
Thursday: Partly cloudy. High of 78 °F/26 °C. Wind SW 6-10 mph. 
Friday: Partly cloudy. High of 70 °F/21 °C. Wind N 10-15 mph.
Saturday: Mostly sunny and cooler with a high of 64 °F/18 °C. Wind NNW 6-12 mph.
Sunday: Mostly sunny with a high of 62 °F/17 °C. Wind NE 16-20 mph.

Round summaries

First round
Thursday, September 17, 2020

2017 PGA Champion and world number three Justin Thomas returned a five-under-par round of 65, the lowest round ever recorded in a U.S. Open at Winged Foot, to take the first round lead. One stroke behind were Thomas Pieters, Matthew Wolff, and 2018 Masters champion Patrick Reed, who made a hole-in-one on the par-3 seventh hole.

Louis Oosthuizen played his final nine holes in five under par to join Lee Westwood and 2011 U.S. Open champion Rory McIlroy in a tie for fifth place at three under par; Oosthuizen's round was his eighth time shooting 67 or better at the U.S. Open, a new tournament record. Six players tied at two under par, three strokes off the lead.

The scoring average for the first round was 72.56, the second-lowest for a first round in U.S. Open history behind 1993. Twenty-one players finished the round under par; just twelve under-par rounds were completed during the entire tournament the last time the U.S. Open was held at Winged Foot in 2006.

Second round
Friday, September 18, 2020

Patrick Reed made five birdies and five bogeys in an even-par round of 70 to take the 36-hole lead at four-under par. Bryson DeChambeau hit his second shot on the par-5 9th hole, his final hole of the day, to six feet and converted the eagle putt to return a two-under-par round of 68, the lowest round of the day, and move into second place, one stroke behind Reed. Overnight leader Justin Thomas made four bogeys in his first eight holes and a double-bogey on the 1st, his 10th, before finishing with two birdies to return a three-over-par round of 73 to tie for third place alongside Harris English and Rafa Cabrera-Bello.

Jason Kokrak followed an opening round 68 with a one-over par 71 to sit alone in 6th place at one under par, three strokes off the lead. A stroke further behind were Hideki Matsuyama (69), Xander Schauffele (72), Brendon Todd (72), Thomas Pieters (74) and Matthew Wolff (74). After starting with a birdie, Rory McIlroy made seven bogeys, a double-bogey and just two further birdies to finish at six over par for the day and three over par for the tournament. A day after 21 players completed under-par rounds, windier conditions contributed to just three (DeChambeau, Matsuyama, and Bubba Watson) managing to do so in the second round.

The 36-hole cut came at 146 (six-over par). Among the players to miss the cut were three-time champion Tiger Woods, defending champion Gary Woodland, PGA Champion Collin Morikawa, Phil Mickelson, Tommy Fleetwood, and former U.S. Open champions Jordan Spieth, Justin Rose, Graeme McDowell, and Martin Kaymer. John Pak, a senior at Florida State, was the only amateur to make the cut.

Amateurs: Pak (+5), Kanaya (+7), Thompson (+7), Ogletree (+8), Augenstein (+9), Scott (+9), Summerhays (+9), Yu (+10), Hammer (+11), Castillo (+12), Michel (+17), Sugrue (+17), Rousaud (+21)

Third round
Saturday, September 19, 2020

Matthew Wolff, making his U.S. Open debut, began the round four strokes off the lead but quickly made up that deficit with five birdies on the front nine. He did not make a bogey until the 16th hole, despite hitting just two of 14 fairways, and closed the round with a 10-foot birdie putt on the 18th hole for a five-under-par round of 65, the lowest round of the day, and a two-stroke lead. At 21, Wolff was the youngest 54-hole leader at the U.S. Open since amateur Jim Simons in 1971.

Bryson DeChambeau bogeyed his first two holes before playing his next 15 in three under par to get within one stroke of Wolff; however, he finished with a bogey on the 18th hole to end the day at three under par, two off the lead. Louis Oosthuizen was the only other player under par after the third round; a two-under-par round of 68, which included three birdies on the back-nine, left him four strokes behind Wolff at one under par. Harris English (72), Hideki Matsuyama (70), and Xander Schauffele (70) were tied for fourth place at even par.

Second-round leader Patrick Reed built a three-stroke advantage with a birdie at the second hole. After nine holes, he retained a share of the lead with Wolff, but he played the back nine in eight over par to tie for 11th place, eight strokes off the lead. After falling away with a second round 76, Rory McIlroy got back into contention at one over par with one of only seven under-par rounds during the day, a two-under-par 68.

Final round
Sunday, September 20, 2020

Summary
Starting the final round two strokes behind, Bryson DeChambeau took the lead on the fifth hole as overnight leader Matthew Wolff made his second bogey of the day. At the par-5 9th hole, both players were on the green in two strokes; after DeChambeau had made a 39-foot putt for an eagle, Wolff was able to match it by holing his putt from ten feet to remain just a stroke behind going into the last nine holes.

At the par-3 10th hole Wolff hit his tee shot into thick rough lining a greenside bunker and was unable to get up and down. DeChambeau then increased his lead to three strokes at the next hole, the par-4 11th, by holing his birdie putt from just off the green. Wolff fell six strokes behind after making another bogey at the 14th hole followed by a double-bogey at the 16th, as DeChambeau recorded a run of pars. Two more pars for DeChambeau, including a seven-foot putt on the 18th, gave him a six-stroke victory.

DeChambeau's three-under-par round of 67 was the best of the day by three shots. He was the only player not to shoot over par in any round, despite hitting just 23 of 56 fairways for the week, the fewest by a U.S. Open champion since at least 1981. He also joined Jack Nicklaus and Tiger Woods as the only players to win the U.S. Amateur, an NCAA title, and the U.S. Open. It was Wolff's second top-5 finish in just his second major championship.

In third place was Louis Oosthuizen at two over par. Harris English was a stroke further back in fourth place, his best finish and first top-ten in a major championship. Xander Schauffele extended his run of finishing in the top 10 of each U.S. Open he has played, securing fifth place on his own with a birdie on the 18th hole. World number one Dustin Johnson finished at five over par alongside Korn Ferry Tour qualifier Will Zalatoris in sixth place. Tied for eighth place at six over par were Tony Finau and four former major winners: Zach Johnson, Justin Thomas, Webb Simpson, and Rory McIlroy, whose challenge effectively ended with a four-putt double-bogey on the first hole and two further bogeys on the opening holes.

Final leaderboard

Scorecard

Cumulative tournament scores, relative to par
{|class="wikitable" span = 50 style="font-size:85%;
|-
|  style="background:Red;  width:10px;"|
|Eagle
|  style="background:Pink; width:10px;"|
|Birdie
|  style="background:PaleGreen; width:10px;"|
|Bogey
|    style="background:Green; width:10px;"|
|Double bogey
|}

Media
On June 29, 2020, it was announced that Fox Sports had opted out of the remaining seven years of its 12-year contract to carry USGA championships and had sold the remainder of the contract to NBCUniversal—marking the return of the U.S. Open to NBC for the first time since 2014. The rescheduling of the tournament had created conflicts with Fox's NFL and college football coverage, and the USGA declined a proposal for the entirety of the tournament to be carried on Fox's cable channel FS1 instead. Fox discussed the possibility of partnering with NBC on the 2020 tournament, but this eventually "led to a broader conversation and eventual agreement for NBCUniversal to take over the USGA media rights".

Early-round coverage aired on Golf Channel; Peacock carried featured groups coverage of the early rounds. Per a sponsorship agreement with Rolex, the final hour of coverage during the final round was broadcast with no commercial interruptions.

The 2020 edition of the U.S. Open featured a total of 43.5 hours of coverage, made up of 11.5 hours on each of Thursday and Friday, 10.5 hours on Saturday, and 10 hours on Sunday. Golf Channel carried a total of 15 hours of coverage: 6.5 hours on each of Thursday and Friday and 2 hours on Sunday; NBC had a total of 20.5 hours of coverage: 3 hours on each of Thursday and Friday, 8.5 hours on Saturday, and 6 hours on Sunday; Peacock streamed 2 hours of coverage each day.

References

External links

Coverage on the PGA Tour's official site
Coverage on the European Tour's official site
Coverage on the PGA of America's official site
Media Guide

U.S. Open (golf)
Golf in New York (state)
Mamaroneck, New York
U.S. Open
U.S. Open (golf)
U.S. Open (golf)
U.S. Open (golf)
U.S. Open (golf)